The Catholic hierarchy in Somalia and Djibouti, predominantly Muslim countries in the Horn of Africa, with ethnically akin population but different colonial heritage (Somalia British and Italian, Djibouti French), comprises only in each nation a single exempt diocese (directly dependent on the Holy See, not part of any ecclesiastical province) :
 Roman Catholic Diocese of Mogadiscio, covering all and only Somalia 
 Roman Catholic Diocese of Djibouti, covering all and Djibouti

Such tiny episcopates warrant no national episcopal conferences, but their Bishops partake in the (predominantly Middle Eastern) Episcopal Conference of the Latin Bishops of the Arabic Regions.

Neither has an Eastern Catholic or pre-diocesan jurisdiction.

There are no titular sees. All defunct jurisdictions have a current successor see.

There formally are an Apostolic Nunciature (papal diplomatic representation at embassy-level)  to Djibouti and an Apostolic Delegation (lower level) to Somalia, but both are vested in the Apostolic Nunciature to Ethiopia (which forms a transnational episcopal conference with Eritrea) in its capital Addis Ababa.

See also 
 List of Catholic dioceses (structured view)
 Catholic Church in Somalia
 Catholic Church in Djibouti

Sources and external links 
 GCatholic - Somalia
 GCatholic - Djibouti

Somalia

Catholic dioceses
Catholic dioceses